Neil Milo Hoag (born May 13, 1941) is an American Democratic Party politician who served in the Vermont House of Representatives from 1997 until his resignation for medical reasons in 2001.

References

External links

1941 births
Living people
People from Bennington, Vermont
Democratic Party members of the Vermont House of Representatives
21st-century American politicians
20th-century American politicians